Lake Sugema [Pronounced sōō•jē’•mə](+40° 41' 22.85", -91° 59' 39.01")  is a man-made  lake  southwest of Keosauqua, Van Buren County, in southeast Iowa, United States. It is located south of the Des Moines River, west of State Highway 1 and north of State Highway 2.

The lake was designed as a high quality fishing lake. Facilities include parking lots, and 3 hard surface boat ramps with no motor size limit at no wake. There are fishing jetties, an accessible fishing pier for the handicapped, accessible facilities, a picnic area, restrooms, camping facilities, floating boat docks, and wildlife islands.

An asphalt road leads off of Hwy 2 to a large camping area with a shelterhouse, sewer dump station, handicapped-accessible showerhouse, playground, 23 hard-surfaced . camp pads, 8 primitive campsites, 8 slip boat docks, and a boat trailer parking area. Cabins located in the campgrounds are available for rental throughout the year.

Lake Sugema is stocked with largemouth bass, walleye, bluegill, black crappie, channel catfish, and saugeye. The lake has fishing jetties and good shore fishing access.

Extensive planning was done by the Iowa Department of Natural Resources to establish underwater structure that helps fish survive and reproduce. When the lake was constructed, steps were taken to prevent siltation. Besides the hundreds of farm ponds, crop rotations, crop residue management, and other soil saving practices farmers have established in the lake's drainage area, the lake is protected by a series of smaller sediment-control dams.

Approximately  immediately surrounding the lake was purchased by the Iowa Department of Natural Resources and Van Buren County to be managed as a wildlife area. That management is helping to build on the number of wild turkey, deer, squirrel, geese, quail, rabbits, songbirds, and other wild animals. Habitat is also being developed for raccoon, fox, mink, muskrats, and bald eagles, among other wildlife.

The Indian Creek Wildlife area is intended for public hunting, fishing, hiking, bird watching, cross country skiing, picnicking, nature study, primitive camping and other fun in the outdoors.

Shimek State Forest is managed as a multiple-use area for timber products, wildlife habitat and recreation. The  forest includes hiking trails and is available for public hunting.

All those activities are available to the public at Lake Sugema and the  Indian Creek Wildlife Area. The Iowa Department of Natural Resources and the Van Buren County Conservation Board are managing the lake, wildlife, and recreation areas.

References

External links
 Contour Map
 Villages of Van Buren

Bodies of water of Van Buren County, Iowa
Sugema
Tourist attractions in Van Buren County, Iowa